Benigno Luigi Papa (25 August 1935 – 6 March 2023) was an Italian Roman Catholic prelate. He was archbishop of Taranto from 1990 to 2011 and bishop of Oppido Mamertina-Palmi from 1981 to 1990.

References

External links
Benigno Luigi Papa at Catholic Hierarchy

1935 births
2023 deaths
Italian Roman Catholic archbishops
20th-century Italian Roman Catholic bishops
Bishops appointed by Pope John Paul II
Pontifical Gregorian University alumni
Pontifical Biblical Institute alumni
People from the Province of Lecce